Banjara Lake or Hamed Khan Kunta is a small water body situated in Banjara Hills in Hyderabad, Telangana, India.

History
The lake was built in 1930. At the time the locality had mansions and residences of royal elite. It was once spread over an area of more than one kilometre.

Conservation
The lake receives sewer water from adjoining localities. Efforts are on to conserve the lake by organisations like Save Our Urban Lakes (SOUL).

References

External links
 nic.in

Lakes of Hyderabad, India
Geography of Hyderabad, India
Artificial lakes of India